Christopher Fairbank (born 4 October 1953) is an English film, stage and television actor.

Career

In 2010, he appeared as a detective in Five Daughters, and as Alfred "Freddie" Lennon in the biopic Lennon Naked.

References

External links
 

1953 births
English male film actors
English male television actors
English male video game actors
English male voice actors
Living people
Male actors from Hertfordshire
People educated at Kent College
Alumni of RADA
20th-century English male actors
21st-century English male actors